Mehtap is a Turkish female given name of Persian origin meaning moonlight or full moon. It may refer to:

 Mehtap TV, television station in Turkey

People with the given name
 Mehtap Demir (born 1978), Turkish singer
 Mehtap Doğan-Sızmaz (born 1978), Turkish female long-distance runner
 Mehtap Kurnaz (born 1995), Turkish women's weightlifter
 Mehtap Oezaslan, professor in electrochemistry

See also
 Mahtab, a given name
 Mehta, an Indian surname
 Mehtab (disambiguation)

Turkish feminine given names